Daria is an American adult animated sitcom created by Glenn Eichler and Susie Lewis Lynn. The series ran from March 3, 1997, to January 21, 2002, on MTV. It focuses on the title character, Daria Morgendorffer, an intelligent, cynical high school student, voiced by Tracy Grandstaff.

It is a spin-off of Mike Judge's earlier animated series, Beavis and Butt-Head, in which Daria appeared as a recurring character. Although Judge allowed the character to star in a spin-off, he had no involvement in the production of Daria himself, as he was busy working on King of the Hill.

In June 2019, MTV announced a Daria animated spin-off series, Jodie (originally Daria & Jodie), with actress Tracee Ellis Ross voicing the titular character and serving as an executive producer. The network characterized the series as the first in multiple projected Daria animated spinoffs. In June 2020, Comedy Central announced it had picked up the spinoff series along with Beavis and Butt-Head. In May 2022, it was announced that Jodie would instead be an animated film.

Premise

The series focuses on Daria Morgendorffer (voiced by Tracy Grandstaff), a smart, acerbic, somewhat misanthropic/cynical teenage girl who, along with her best friend, aspiring artist Jane Lane, observes the world around her. The show is set in the fictional suburban American town of Lawndale and is a satire of high school life, full of allusions to and criticisms of popular culture and social classes. As the show's eponymous protagonist, Daria appears in most scenes with her immediate family (mother Helen, father Jake, and younger sister Quinn) and/or Jane. It is set during Daria's high-school years and ends with her graduation and acceptance into college. The principal location used for the show (outside of the Morgendorffer home) is Lawndale High School, a public-education institution filled with colorful and dysfunctional characters. The dynamics among the two lead characters changed during season four, when Jane began a relationship with Tom Sloane. Though Daria is hesitant to accept Tom at first, fearing she will lose her best friend, she and Tom find themselves becoming closer, culminating in a kiss in the season finale. The emotional and comedic turmoil among Jane, Tom, and Daria was the centerpiece of the TV movie Is It Fall Yet?, and the relationship between Tom and Daria fueled several of season five's plotlines.

The plots of Daria largely concern a juxtaposition between the central character's jaded, sardonic cynicism and the values/preoccupations of her suburban American hometown of Lawndale. In a 2005 interview, series co-creator Glenn Eichler described the otherwise unspecified locale as "a mid-Atlantic suburb, outside somewhere like Baltimore or Washington, D.C. They could have lived in Pennsylvania near the Main Line, though". For comedic and illustrative purposes, the show's depiction of suburban American life was a deliberately exaggerated one. In The New York Times, the protagonist was described as "a blend of Dorothy Parker, Fran Lebowitz, and Janeane Garofalo, wearing Carrie Donovan's glasses. Daria Morgendorffer, 16 and cursed with a functioning brain, has the misfortune to see high school, her family, and her life for exactly what they are and the temerity to comment on it."

History
Daria Morgendorffer, the show's title character and protagonist, first appeared on MTV as a recurring character in Mike Judge's Beavis and Butt-Head. MTV senior vice president and creative director Abby Terkuhle explained that when that show "became successful, we ... created Daria's character because we wanted a smart female who could serve as the foil". Daria's original design was created by Bill Peckmann while working for J.J. Sedelmaier Productions during Beavis and Butt-Head's first season. During production of Beavis and Butt-Heads final seasons, MTV representatives, wanting to bring in a higher female demographic to the channel, approached story editor Glenn Eichler, offering a spin-off series for Daria. In 1995, a five-minute pilot, "Sealed with a Kick", was created by Eichler and Beavis and Butt-Head staffer Susie Lewis (although written by Sam Johnson and Chris Marcil). Among 4 other animated pilots pitched to the channel, Daria performed the strongest in focus groups, especially among middle school-aged participants. A fact that bothered MTV initially, as they felt their core audience at the time was instead 18-to-24 year olds. But after show staff argued that college students don't really watch much television, MTV approved a series order of 13 episodes; both Eichler and Lewis were signed onto the series as executive producers.

The first episode of Daria aired on March 3, 1997, roughly nine months before Beavis and Butt-Head ended its original run. Titled "Esteemsters", the episode established Daria and her family's move from fictional Highland, the setting of Beavis and Butt-Head, to the new series' equally fictional locale of Lawndale. As well as introducing Daria's parents and younger sister as principal supporting characters, the first episode also introduced Jane Lane, Daria's best friend and confidante. Other than a brief mention of Highland, Daria did not contain any references to Beavis and Butt-Head.

The series ran for five seasons, with 13 episodes each, as well as two TV movies and two TV specials. The first movie, Is It Fall Yet?, aired on August 27, 2000, and took place between seasons four and five. MTV planned an abbreviated six-episode sixth season, but, at Eichler's request, this project was cut down to a second movie, Is It College Yet?, which served as the series finale on January 21, 2002.

Production
No other characters from Beavis and Butt-Head appeared on Daria; the only direct reference to them was in promotions. Glenn Eichler, in an interview conducted after the series' run, explained:

B&B were very strong characters, with a very specific type of humor and very loyal fans, and of course they were instantly identifiable. I felt that referencing them in Daria, while we were trying to establish the new characters and the different type of humor, ran the risk of setting up false expectations and disappointment in the viewers – which could lead to a negative reaction to the new show and its different tone. So we steered clear of B&B in the early going, and once the new show was established, there was really no need to harken back to the old one.

In the TV movie Is It Fall Yet?, several celebrities provided guest voices. Talk show host Carson Daly played Quinn's summer tutor, female pop punk singer Bif Naked played Jane's art camp companion, and rock musician Dave Grohl played Jane's pretentious art camp host. Several songs by the band Foo Fighters (for which Grohl is frontman) were featured in the series.

Episodes

There have been 65 episodes of Daria, spanning five seasons, each with thirteen episodes. The series first went into production with a pilot episode, titled "Sealed with a Kick". The first season was broadcast between March 3 and July 21, 1997, while season two was aired from February 16 to August 2, 1998; season three was shown from February 17 to August 18, 1999; season four from February 25 to August 2, 2000, and finally, season five between February 19 and June 25, 2001.

The series also includes two feature-length television films; the first, Is It Fall Yet?, which aired between seasons four and five, and chronicles the lives of the characters during summer break, and the second film, Is It College Yet?, which followed the fifth season, serving as the official finale to the series.

Two specials were also aired; Daria: Behind the Scenes was hosted by Janeane Garofalo and aired on February 18, 2000, one week prior to the season four premiere, and featured how the show was created, the making of the show, and the voices behind the characters. The second special, Look Back in Annoyance, aired on January 14, 2002, and is a retrospective hosted by Daria and Jane and highlights all the major events from the series before the lead-up to the television film finale, which was aired one week later.

Music and licensing
Daria'''s theme song is "You're Standing on My Neck", written and performed by Splendora. The band later created original themes for the two Daria TV movies, "Turn the Sun Down" (for Is It Fall Yet?) and "College Try (Gives Me Blisters)" (for Is It College Yet?), along with some background music.

The show itself had no original score. Though elements from Splendora's theme were used on occasion, Daria's incidental music was taken from pop music songs. Most of these were contemporary, inserted over exterior shots and some scenes, with rarely any story relevance or awareness from the characters. For example, one episode depicts characters dancing to Will Smith's "Gettin' Jiggy wit It" mere weeks after the song's release, whereas the sequence itself was designed and animated months earlier.

Some story points were built around specific songs, such as in "Legends of the Mall", where Cyndi Lauper's "Girls Just Want to Have Fun" became a major plot point for a fantasy sequence. The closing credits also featured a licensed song on all but a few occasions, the lyrics or concept of which often reflected some aspect of the preceding episode.

For the 1998 and 1999 VHS releases of some Daria episodes, incidental music was replaced, and "You're Standing on My Neck" was only played over the closing credits. However, for the bonus episodes included on the DVD releases of the two TV movies, the music was removed almost entirely.

In the DVD release Daria: The Complete Series, creator Glenn Eichler says in the notes that "99 percent of the music has been changed, because the cost of licensing the many music bites we used would have made it impossible to release the collection (and for many years did)." He compared it to an episode of The Twilight Zone where the astronaut comes home, and his wife can't figure out what's different about him, "... until it dawns on her that instead of a cool song from 1997 playing ... it's some tune she's never heard. Yeah, it's just like that."

The song "Heart's on Fire" by 38 Special also enjoyed a brief comeback on some late 1990s radio stations because of the popularity of the series as well as the Amy Grant b-side hit "I Love You" (from her popular crossover album Unguarded), "Silent Running" by Mike and the Mechanics, and "Stand and Deliver" by Mr. Mister.

ReceptionDaria premiered to positive reviews, with John J. O'Connor of The New York Times writing in March 1997, "As far as MTV and Beavis and Butt-Head are concerned, Daria is an indispensable blast of fresh air." Daria continued to receive positive reviews during the course of its run and was one of MTV's highest rated shows, with the network's manager Van Toffler viewing the character as "a good spokesperson for MTV, intelligent but subversive".

During the program's run on MTV, Daria was part of the Cool Crap Auction, giving an overview of the goods for auction and talking "live" to the winner of one prize. Daria and Jane also hosted MTV's Top Ten Animated Videos Countdown, poking fun at MTV's cheap animation. At the end of the series run, she had an "interview" on the CBS Early Show with Jane Clayson. Daria received a ratings share between 1 and 2 percent, about 1 to 2 million viewers.

G.J. Donnelly of TV Guide, writing about the series' finale, lamented, "I already miss that monotone. I already miss those boots. ... Even at its most far-fetched, this animated film approaches the teenage experience much more realistically than shows like Dawson's Creek." On the same occasion, Emily Nussbaum wrote at Slate that "the show is biting the dust without ever getting the credit it deserved: for social satire, witty writing, and most of all, for a truly original main character". She particularly singled out for praise that all the characters were heading "to very different paths in life, based on their economic prospects," giving the show an ambiguous end; "[the finale is] a bit of a classic: a sharply funny exploration of social class most teen films would render, well, cartoonish."

Legacy
In 2002, TV Guide ranked Daria number 41 on its "50 Greatest Cartoon Characters of All Time" list. In December 2013, the UK newspaper The Daily Telegraph included Daria in its list of "best female cartoon characters".

In April 2017, in commemoration of the 20th anniversary of the series, co-creator Susie Lewis and character designer Karen Disher were contacted by the Entertainment Weekly magazine to reimagine the lives of the main characters 20 years after the events of the series. During that interview, Lewis admitted that she would "love to bring Daria back to TV".

In June 2018, Hulu acquired rights to stream Daria. The show was removed from Hulu at the end of September 2020 before it became available for streaming on CBS All Access (now known as Paramount+) from November 2020.

In November 2018, IndieWire named Daria as the fourth-best animated series of all time.

On June 21, 2018, it was announced that a reboot series titled Daria & Jodie was one of several revival projects in development at MTV Studios, a production studio which intends to sell new series to over-the-top media services. The title was later changed to Jodie. In May 2022, it was announced that Jodie would instead be an animated film that will air on Comedy Central and be animated by Awesome Inc

Merchandise
Home video
On October 21, 1997 Sony released Daria on VHS, and on August 31, 1999, released Daria: Disfranchised on VHS.

In July 2004, co-creator Glenn Eichler said of possible DVD releases, "There's no distributor and no release date, but what there is very strong interest from MTV in putting Daria out, and steady activity toward making that a reality".

By July 2009, a DVD release for the series was planned for 2010.<ref>{{cite web|url=http://www.tvshowsondvd.com/news/Daria-DVDs-Planned/12236|title='"Daria DVDs planned|publisher=Tvshowsondvd.com|access-date=November 24, 2014|url-status=dead|archive-url=https://web.archive.org/web/20140406224212/http://www.tvshowsondvd.com/news/Daria-DVDs-Planned/12236|archive-date=April 6, 2014}}</ref> In January 2010, MTV released a teaser trailer on its website for Darias 2010 release. That May 11, Daria: The Complete Animated Series was released on DVD in North America by Paramount Home Entertainment. All 65 episodes and both TV movies are included in the set. Extras include the pilot episode, the music video "Freakin' Friends" by Mystik Spiral, "Daria Day" introductions as well as a top ten video countdown on MTV by Jane and Daria, cast and crew interviews, and a script for an unproduced Mystik Spiral spin-off show. The set, with all special features intact, was released on Region 4 PAL DVD on June 1, 2011. The Region 4 set was found to be encoded region free.

Books
 Nicoll, Peggy. The Daria Database, MTV, 1998. 
 Bernstein, Anne D.. The Daria Diaries, MTV, 1998.

Software
 Daria's Sick, Sad Life Planner (1999)
 Daria's Inferno (2000)

GPS
In late 2010, following the DVD release, Daria was licensed as a voice for Garmin and TomTom GPS systems; original putdowns and jokes were recorded.

Related media
 MTV Video Music Awards 1997 short animation featuring Daria (September 4, 1997)
 Daria called into MTV's Cool Crap Auction
 Daria Day 1998 marathon of Daria episodes on the date of the premiere of the second season (February 16, 1998), hosted by Daria and Jane.
 Daria Day 1999 marathon of Daria episodes on February 15, 1999 for the premiere episode of the third season, hosted by Daria and Jane.
 Daria and Jane hosted a Daria episode marathon titled Sarcastathon 3000 for the premiere episode of the fifth season.
 Daria and Jane hosted an episode of 'MTV's Top 10'. Commenting on the top 10 animated music videos
 Behind the Scenes at Daria hosted by Janeane Garofalo.
 MTV's Toonumentary detailed the history and details of MTV's animated shows.
 MTV New Year's Eve 2002 event featured a short appearance by Daria (December 31, 2001).
 Look Back in Annoyance was a half-hour retrospective of the series, hosted by Daria and Jane, that aired in January 2002, prior to the airing of the second telefilm.
 Daria was interviewed on CBS' The Early Show on January 21, 2002.
 In 2013, CollegeHumor created a parody trailer for a live-action Daria film starring Aubrey Plaza.

References

External links

 
 
 Daria at the Big Cartoon DataBase

 
1997 American television series debuts
2002 American television series endings
1990s American adult animated television series
1990s American black comedy television series
1990s American comedy-drama television series
1990s American high school television series
1990s American romantic comedy television series
1990s American satirical television series
1990s American teen drama television series
1990s American teen sitcoms
2000s American adult animated television series
2000s American black comedy television series
2000s American comedy-drama television series
2000s American high school television series
2000s American romantic comedy television series
2000s American satirical television series
2000s American teen drama television series
2000s American teen sitcoms
American adult animated comedy television series
American adult animated drama television series
American adult animated television spin-offs
American animated sitcoms
English-language television shows
MTV cartoons
Teen animated television series
Animated television series about dysfunctional families
Television shows set in the United States
Television shows adapted into video games